Fantoche is an animation film festival with international participation and takes place each year in the city of Baden, Switzerland.

The first Fantoche took place in 1995 with the goal to enrich the Swiss cultural life with an animation film festival of international reach. Today, Fantoche has become indeed an inter branch meeting point for visual media. All kinds of different animation films, most of them Short films but some feature-length movies as well, are shown in four different cinemas.

The festival sets various priorities like the Swiss film industry, children's film, history, Asia, the US, etc. The competition programme aims to challenge the artistic border of animation film and to push it forward.

Award winner 
In 2005 an amount of 23'000 Swiss francs has been awarded in the following categories:
 High Risk- Winner Craig Welch (CA) for Welcome to Kentucky
 Hot Talent – Winner Takashi Kimura (JP) for Striking Daughter
 Best Visual – Winner JJ Villard (US) for Son of Satan
 Best Sound – Winner Dmitrij Geller (RU) for Little Night Symphony
 Best Idea/Best Script – Winner Arash Riahi (AT) for Mississippi
 Audience Award – Winner Laura Neuvonen (FI) for The last Knit and Ivan Maksimov (RU) for The Wind Along the Coast
 Minimotion – Winner Jean-Claude Campell (CH) for Metamorpho

In 2007, the prestigious jury prize was awarded to two Russian movies, which, in accordance to the jury, "particularly point out the innovative character of Russian animation films. The 10'000 francs worth main award was awarded to "Foolish Girl" by the Russian artist Zoija Kirejewa for "the celebration of a strange female character, an unconventional screenplay and its captured universality through brief moments of beautiful drawings, emotions and gestures".

In 2009, Fantoche introduced a Swiss competition with an award ("Best Swiss") and an Audience Award. One year later the national award "High Swiss Risk" was awarded as well. Furthermore were there two new awards of children's film after 2009; one jury award( which consisted of a five-headed children's jury) and a children's Audience Award.

Award winners since 2009 by category 

International Competition:
Best Film:

Audience Award:

High Risk:

New Talent:

Best Story (awarded till 2013):

Best Visual:

Best Sound:

National Competition:

Best Swiss:

Audience Award:

High Swiss Risk:

Award „Best Kids“:

Best Kids:

Children's Audience Award:

Other categories:

Badener Prize of honour:

A selection of the films can be watched in different Swiss cities under the name Fantoche on Tour.

References

External links 
 Fantoche – Offizielle Homepage

Animation film festivals
Film festivals in Switzerland